Fernanda Cristina Ferreira (born January 10, 1980), known as Fernandinha, is a Brazilian professional volleyball player. She plays for Brazil women's national volleyball team as a setter. She has competed and won a gold medal at the 2012 Summer Olympics.

Clubs
  Pinheiros (1998–2000)
  São Caetano (2000–2002)
  Paraná Vôlei (2002–2003)
  Pinheiros (2003–2005)
  Brasil Esporte Club (2005–2006)
  Finasa Osasco (2006–2007)
  Santeramo Sport (2007–2008)
  Busto Arsizio (2008–2010)
  Universal Modena (2010–2012)
  Igtisadchi Baku (2012)
  Vôlei Amil Campinas (2012–2013)
  Hinode Barueri (2013–2014)
  Pavia Volley (2014–2015)
  Nantes Volley-Ball (2015–2017)
  Clube Curitibano (2017–2018)

Awards

Clubs
 2006–07 Brazilian Superliga –  Runner-up, with Finasa Osasco
 2006-07 - Brazilian Superliga 
 2007 - Brazilian Cup 
 2006 - Paulista championship 
 2005 - Open Games of the Interior of São Paulo 
 2005 - Sao Paulo Regional Games 
 2009–10 CEV Cup –  Champion, with Yamamay Busto Arsizio

Individual
 Best setter and best server salompa’s cup 2003
 MVP Bruna Forte Tournament 2007

References

External links
 
 
 
  
 

1980 births
Brazilian women's volleyball players
Living people
Olympic volleyball players of Brazil
Volleyball players at the 2012 Summer Olympics
Olympic gold medalists for Brazil
Olympic medalists in volleyball
Medalists at the 2012 Summer Olympics
Setters (volleyball)
Volleyball players from Rio de Janeiro (city)